The Old Sheldon Church Ruins is a historic site located in northern Beaufort County, South Carolina, approximately 17 miles (30 km) north of Beaufort in the Sheldon area.

History 
Known also as the Sheldon Church or Old Sheldon Church, the building was originally known as Prince William's Parish Church.  The church was built as a chapel of ease in the English Georgian style, using the Roman Tuscan or Doric order, between 1745 and 1753.

The traditional understanding is that Prince William's was burned by the British in 1779 during the Revolutionary War, rebuilt in 1826, and then burned again in 1865 during the Civil War by the Federal Army under General William T Sherman::

However, an alternative view has more recently come to light. In a letter dated February 3, 1866, Milton Leverett wrote that "Sheldon Church not burn't. Just torn up in the inside, but can be repaired." In this view, the inside of the church was apparently gutted to reuse materials to rebuild homes burnt by Sherman's army.

Today 

The ruins lie among majestic oaks and scattered graves. Inside the ruins of the church lie the remains of Governor William Bull, who "greatly assisted General Oglethorpe in establishing the physical layout of Savannah, Georgia. Bull surveyed the land in 1733 to form the basic grid pattern of the streets and squares." The ruins proved to be a popular site in the Lowcountry for photographers and wedding ceremonies in contemporary times. As of October 2015, the Old Sheldon ruins are not available to the public for hosting wedding ceremonies; however, since 1925, an annual service has been held the second Sunday after Easter by clergy from the Parish Church of St. Helena in Beaufort.

References

External links

Sheldon Church Ruins - Beaufort County, S.C.
 Discover South Carolina
 Old Sheldon Church

Historic districts on the National Register of Historic Places in South Carolina
National Historic Landmarks in South Carolina
Geography of Beaufort County, South Carolina
Buildings and structures in Beaufort, South Carolina
Historic American Buildings Survey in South Carolina
Archaeological sites on the National Register of Historic Places in South Carolina
Churches on the National Register of Historic Places in South Carolina
Episcopal churches in South Carolina
Ruins in the United States
Churches in Beaufort County, South Carolina
18th-century Episcopal church buildings
Anglican churches in South Carolina
Colonial South Carolina
English-American culture in South Carolina
National Register of Historic Places in Beaufort County, South Carolina